Jellyfish stings in Australia can cause pain, paralysis and death for swimmers with exposed skin. Numerous venomous species of jellyfish occur in Australian waters, including the box jellyfish and Irukandji Jellyfish. Box jellyfish are believed to have caused at least 69 deaths since record keeping began in 1883. Although they are commonly mistaken for jellyfish, bluebottles are actually siphonophores.

Numbers of stings 
Irukandji are rarely found outside Queensland, the Northern Territory and Western Australia. Between 1985 and 1997 from cases of Irukandji sting where location was recorded, there were 83.4% in Queensland, 9.1% in the Northern Territory, and 7.5% in Western Australia; 81.5% of cases occurred in the afternoon. In a fourteen-year period there were 660 Irukandji stings in Australia, which were recorded by Dr Fenner, a medical officer with Surf Lifesaving Australia. There were 159 Irukandji stings reported in Broome in a five-year period with 25% of those stung being hospitalised but no recorded deaths. There were 62 people reported being stung by Irukandji in Cairns in 1996; of these more than half occurred in December, 92% were stung on hotter than average days, with 63% occurring while swimming inside a stinger net enclosure on the beach. In summer 2001–02 there were 160 people stung by the middle of February, with around 100 of these in Cairns, and between 10 and 20 in Townsville, the Whitsundays, Great Keppel and Agnes Water.

Northern Territory hospitals report approximately 40 jellyfish stings annually.

List of fatal stings

This is a list of fatal jellyfish stings that occurred in Australian territorial waters by decade in reverse chronological order.

21st century

20th century

19th century

See also
Irukandji syndrome

References

External links
Box Jellyfish, dangers on the Great Barrier Reef
reefed.edu.au, Jellyfish 
Stinging Jellyfish in tropical Australia, Reef Research Centre
Jellyfish, treatment for stings, Australian Venom Compendium
Jellyfish in Tropical North Australia, Jellyfish in Tropical North Australia
https://www.theguardian.com/lifeandstyle/2016/jul/29/stung-by-one-deadliest-creatures-earth-experience#img-1

Animal attacks in Australia
Invertebrate attacks
Cubozoa